Railway Roundabout may refer to:

 Railway Roundabout (TV series), BBC television series
 Railway Roundabout (roundabout), roundabout in Hobart, Tasmania